Mondly is a leading online language learning platform that enables over 100 million learners from 190 countries to learn 41 languages. Launched in 2014, it quickly became a household name in the mobile space, reaching the #1 position in Education in most European countries, LATAM and Asia. Mondly is also a pioneer in VR Education, with its most recent launch on Meta Quest being in the top 10 VR apps worldwide. Starting May 2022, Mondly became a part of Pearson, the world’s leading learning company, and continues its mission to make language learning fun, easy and accessible to everyone.

Mondly is a freemium language-learning platform comprising a website and several different apps that help people learn foreign languages using an innovative and highly gamified approach. Based on a methodology that combines vocabulary & phrase learning with state-of-the-art speech recognition and chatbot technologies, Mondly aims to help learners speak a new language with confidence. The app provides instant feedback and pronunciation, as well as grammar features and conjugation tables.

History
Mondly is based in Brașov, Romania and was founded at the end of 2013 by Alexandru Iliescu and Tudor Iliescu, graduates of Transilvania University of Brașov.

The company launched the first app in May 2014 on AppStore and on Google Play in June 2015. A year later, in August 2016, launched the first chatbot with speech recognition on both iTunes and Google Play.

In February 2017, Mondly launched MondlyVR, the first virtual reality language app with speech recognition. By September, the app was available on both Oculus Store and Google Play.

In May 2017, the company launched MondlyKids, an iOS and Android language app for children aged 5 to 12 and then, in March 2018, launched MondlyAR, the first augmented reality language app with speech recognition.

In early 2020, Mondly made its main app available on Huawei AppGallery. 

In October 2020, Mondly announced its partnership with Oxford University Press on a new suite of custom English grammar and vocabulary tests.

Following a rise in interest in VR education, the company launched Mondly VR on the Oculus Quest store in August 2021.

In the third quarter of 2021, Mondly became the second most downloaded language learning app worldwide.

Language courses
As of 2017, Mondly made available courses for 33 languages using localized content in 33 native languages. The available levels of language proficiency are beginner, intermediate and advanced.

In 2020, the app introduced courses for 8 new languages: Bengali, Catalan, Latin, Latvian, Lithuanian, Slovak, Tagalog and Urdu. With this update, the app’s portfolio has grown from 33 to 41 languages.

Products
Mondly Languages is a language learning app that integrates chatbot and speech recognition technologies to help users learn any of the 33 languages it offers.

Mondly Kids is a language learning app for toddlers and kids.

MondlyVR  is a language learning app in virtual reality available on Steam and the Oculus Store compatible with Oculus Rift and Oculus Quest headsets.

MondlyAR features an avatar “teacher” who brings virtual objects – planets, animals, musical instruments, etc. – into the room as teaching tools, engages the user in conversations and gives instant feedback on pronunciation using the chatbot technology.

Recognition and awards
In January 2016, Mondly Languages was named “Best New App” by Apple and a year later it received the FbStart “App of the Year” award for Europe, Middle East & Africa offered by Facebook. 

In December 2017, Mondly Languages and MondlyKids have both been chosen as “Editors’ Choice” in Google Play.

In 2018, Mondly was named a “Cool Vendor” in Consumer Mobile Applications and Bots by Gartner and included in Deloitte’s Fast 50 Rising Stars. Alexandru Iliescu, the CEO and co-founder of Mondly, was named Founder of the Year at the Central European Startup Awards.

In February 2019, the founders of Mondly were awarded the “Emerging Entrepreneur of the Year: Technology & Innovation” prize by Ernst & Young. In July, Mondly was named „Best Online Language Learning Portal” in Germany by the Deutsches Institut für Service-Qualität.

In November 2021, Mondly won the Chairman’s Award at the WITSA Global ICT Excellence Awards.

References

External links
 Official website
 Web interface of the learning application

Proprietary language learning software
Virtual learning environments
Software companies of Romania
Android (operating system) software